The Hungerford Bridge crosses the River Thames in London, and lies between Waterloo Bridge and Westminster Bridge. Owned by Network Rail Infrastructure Ltd (who use its official name of Charing Cross Bridge) it is a steel truss railway bridge flanked by two more recent, cable-stayed, pedestrian bridges that share the railway bridge's foundation piers, and which are named the Golden Jubilee Bridges.

The north end of the bridge is Charing Cross railway station, and is near Embankment Pier and the Victoria Embankment. The south end is near Waterloo station, County Hall, the Royal Festival Hall, and the London Eye. Each pedestrian bridge has steps and lift access.

History

The first Hungerford Bridge, designed by Isambard Kingdom Brunel, opened in 1845 as a suspension footbridge. It was named after the then Hungerford Market, because it went from the South Bank, specifically a northern point of Lambeth, soon close to London Waterloo station to that place on the north side of the Thames, specifically to the market (later Charing Cross Station) about 200 yards or metres east of Trafalgar Square partly in the parish of Saint Martin in the Fields, Westminster, the spire of which can be seen from the bridge.

In 1859 the original bridge was bought by the railway company extending the South Eastern Railway into the newly opened Charing Cross railway station. The railway company replaced the suspension bridge with a structure designed by Sir John Hawkshaw, comprising nine spans made of wrought iron lattice girders, which opened in 1864. The chains from the old bridge were re-used in Bristol's Clifton Suspension Bridge. The original brick pile buttresses of Brunel's footbridge are still in use, though the one on the Charing Cross side is now much closer to the river bank than it was originally, due to the building of the Victoria Embankment, completed in 1870. The buttress on the South Bank side still has the entrances and steps from the original steamer pier Brunel built on to the footbridge.

To compensate for the removal of the footbridge, walkways were added on each side, with the western one later being removed when the railway was widened. Another walkway was temporarily added in 1951 when an Army Bailey bridge was constructed for the Festival of Britain. In 1980 a temporary walkway was erected on the western side while the eastern railway bridge and walkway were refurbished. It is one of three bridges in London to carry pedestrians and rolling stock; the others being Fulham Railway Bridge and Barnes Bridge.

The footbridge gained a reputation for being narrow, dilapidated and dangerous; it was the scene of a murder in 1999. In the mid-1990s a decision was made to replace the footbridge with new structures on either side of the existing railway bridge, and a competition was held in 1996 for a new design.

Further justification for new footbridge structures on the west flank and east flank was that the brittle wrought iron support pillars of Sir John Hawkshaw's railway bridge were vulnerable to impact from riverboats. It was felt,  especially following the Marchioness disaster, that these should be clad in concrete at water level; but the bridge's owners, Railtrack, could not afford the work. The Golden Jubilee Bridges achieved this protection at no cost to Railtrack.

The new footbridges

The concept design for the new footbridges was won by architects Lifschutz Davidson Sandilands and engineers WSP Group. Detailed design of the two bridges was carried out by consulting engineers Gifford, now Ramboll UK. The steelwork for the new footbridges was fabricated by Butterley Engineering Ltd. of Ripley, Derbyshire.

Their construction was complicated by the need to keep the railway bridge operating without interruptions, the Bakerloo line tunnels passing only a few feet under the river bed, and the potential danger of unexploded World War II bombs in the Thames mud. Despite extensive surveys of the riverbed, London Underground was unwilling to accept these risks and preliminary works were stopped in 2000. The design was modified so that the support structure on the north side, which would have been within  of the tube lines, was moved out of the river bed and onto Victoria Embankment. Excavation near the tube lines was carried out when the tube was closed, and foundations were hand-dug for additional security.

They were named the Golden Jubilee Bridges, in honour of the fiftieth anniversary of Queen Elizabeth II's accession, although in practice they are often still referred to as the "Hungerford Footbridges".

This process was repeated five times until each deck spanned the river, supported by six temporary piers made of steel and concrete. The seven 25-tonne pylons were then raised over the subsequent two weeks. Once the pylons had been installed, the decks were jacked up to enable their connection with the cable stays suspended from the pylons. The concrete deck was then lowered into its final position and the temporary piers and supports were dismantled.

The design of the bridges is complex. Each of the two decks is supported by inclined outward-leaning pylons. Because the pylons lean the back stays are under tension. The deck is secured in place by steel collars fitted around (although not supported by) the pillars of the railway bridge; the collars are themselves attached to the bridge's foundations by tie-down rods. The entire structure is thus held in place by exploiting the tensions between the pylons and the various stay rods and struts.

The new bridges won the Specialist category in the Royal Fine Art Commission Building of the Year Award in 2003. It gained a Structural Achievement Award commendation in the 2004 Institution of Structural Engineers awards, and has won awards from the Civic Trust and for its lighting design.

In 2014, the planning application for the now cancelled Garden Bridge, revealed in its assessment of pedestrian movement across the Thames that the footbridges are the busiest in London, with an estimated footfall of 8.5 million each year.

In fiction

 "Hungerford Bridge" by Elizabeth Hand, Conjunctions 52, 2009.
 "The Woman Who Fell In Love With The Hungerford Bridge" by Lavie Tidhar, Ambit 2014.

See also
List of crossings of the River Thames
List of bridges in London
Charing Cross Bridge (Monet series)

References

External links

Survey of London entry
Golden Jubilee Footbridges 
 Hungerford Bridge (1845) had a span of  Bridgemeister

 Hungerford Bridge Graveyard
 Imágenes y descripción del puente de Hungerford en PUENTEMANÍA (Español)

Golden Jubilee of Elizabeth II
Railway bridges in London
Cable-stayed bridges in England
Transport in the City of Westminster
Transport in the London Borough of Lambeth
Bridges completed in 1845
Bridges completed in 1864
Bridges completed in 2002
Rebuilt buildings and structures in the United Kingdom
Buildings and structures in the City of Westminster
Buildings and structures in the London Borough of Lambeth
Pedestrian bridges across the River Thames
Bridges by Isambard Kingdom Brunel
Southbank Centre
2002 establishments in England
1845 establishments in England
1864 establishments in England
Pedestrian bridges in London
Bridge light displays